Helen Mary Innocent (born 14 March 1977 in Kerala) is a field hockey goalkeeper from India, who made her international debut for her native country in 1992 in the test series against Germany. In 2003, she saved two penalty strokes in final tie-breaker to win title for India at the Afro-Asian Games in Hyderabad. She also earned the Arjuna Award.

International senior tournaments
 1996 – Indira Gandhi Gold Cup, New Delhi
 1997 – World Cup Qualifier, Harare (4th)
 1998 – World Cup, Utrecht (12th)
 1998 – Commonwealth Games, Kuala Lumpur (4th)
 1998 – Asian Games, Bangkok (2nd)
 1999 – Asia Cup, New Delhi (2nd)
 2000 – Olympic Qualifier, Milton Keynes (10th)
 2001 – World Cup Qualifier, Amiens/Abbeville (7th)
 2002 – Champions Challenge, Johannesburg (3rd)
 2002 – Commonwealth Games, Manchester (1st)
 2002 – Asian Games, Busan (4th)
 2003 – Afro-Asian Games, Hyderabad (1st)
 2004 – Asia Cup, New Delhi (1st)
 2006 – Commonwealth Games, Melbourne (2nd)
 2006 – World Cup, Madrid (11th)

References

External links
Profile on Bharatiyahockey
Commonwealth Games Biography
 Hellen Innocent Mary plays lead role in India's victory

1977 births
Recipients of the Arjuna Award
Commonwealth Games gold medallists for India
Commonwealth Games silver medallists for India
Field hockey players at the 1998 Commonwealth Games
Field hockey players at the 2002 Commonwealth Games
Field hockey players at the 2006 Commonwealth Games
Indian female field hockey players
Female field hockey goalkeepers
Living people
Field hockey players from Kerala
Malayali people
Field hockey players at the 1998 Asian Games
Field hockey players at the 2002 Asian Games
Sportswomen from Kerala
Commonwealth Games medallists in field hockey
20th-century Indian women
20th-century Indian people
Medalists at the 1998 Asian Games
Asian Games medalists in field hockey
Asian Games silver medalists for India
Medallists at the 2002 Commonwealth Games
Medallists at the 2006 Commonwealth Games